E. Ramasubramanian is an Indian politician and former Member of the Legislative Assembly. He was elected to the Tamil Nadu legislative assembly as an Anna Dravida Munnetra Kazhagam candidate from Srivaikuntam constituency in 1980 election.

References 

All India Anna Dravida Munnetra Kazhagam politicians
Possibly living people
Year of birth missing
Tamil Nadu MLAs 1980–1984